164 GPIE "Miguel de Cervantes" (164th High School with Advanced Studies in Spanish Language "Miguel de Cervantes) is among the top and most prestigious secondary schools in Bulgaria and the Balkans, based in the capital city of Sofia.

The school, founded in 1991, is the first school in Bulgaria to teach Spanish as a first language and one of three now.

164 GPIE "Miguel de Cervantes" and the American College of Sofia are considered to be the best high schools in Bulgaria. The students of the two schools almost always take the first two places, with very small differences, in the Bulgarian matriculations, with results higher than 5,60 which is considered an "A+++" in Bulgaria, and almost always they are the only schools, whose average results are "A++++"s. The differences are small, mostly in the range 1е-20.

Name
The school's name comes from the famous Miguel de Cervantes, a Spanish novelist, poet, and playwright, also the author of Don Quixote, born on 9 October 1547, in Alcalá de Henares.

Educational institutions established in 1991
Schools in Sofia
1991 establishments in Bulgaria

Reference